Galhenage Randika Chandimali Samanthi (born 14 August 1978), known as Randika Galhenage is a former Sri Lankan cricketer who represented the Sri Lanka.

A wicket-keeper, Galhenage played in 15 women's One Day Internationals between 2002 and 2006.

References

1978 births
Living people
Cricketers from Colombo
Sri Lanka women One Day International cricketers
Sri Lankan women cricketers
Wicket-keepers